Garden of Heaven is a 2003 South Korean film starring Ahn Jae-wook and Lee Eun-ju.

Plot 
Oh-sung, a doctor at a hospice facility, is emotionally scarred by the experience of losing his parents as a child. One night he meets Young-ju, a make-up artist who has been diagnosed with terminal stomach cancer. Despite having very little time together, the two start to develop feelings for each other.

Cast 
 Ahn Jae-wook ... Choi Oh-sung
 Lee Eun-ju ... Kim Young-ju
 Son Jong-beom ... Jeong Jeol
 Jeon Moo-song ... Choi
 Oh Yoon-hong ... Kim Young-ja
 Song Ok-sook ... Moon

References

External links 
 
 
 

2003 films
Medical-themed films
2000s Korean-language films
South Korean romantic drama films
2000s South Korean films